Ballygarvan GAA is a Gaelic Athletic Association club based in the village of Ballygarvan, County Cork, Ireland. The club fields teams in hurling, Gaelic football and camogie. The club plays in the Carrigdhoun division of Cork GAA.

History

The earliest reference to Ballygarvan National Hurling Club occurs in 1828 in an account of the South Cork Hurling Championship. The club was victorious in winning the county senior championship title, defeating Bartlemey in 1879, in a competition predating the formation of the Gaelic Athletic Association in 1884. The Ballygarvan club was a founding-member of the Cork County Board in December 1886 and continued to be at the leading edge of activities in the Association's formative years. The club contested, without success, the county finals of 1888 and 1896.

The establishment of the Divisional Boards in 1924 led to the Ballygarvan club participating in the various Carrigdhoun-controlled competitions. During the Emergency, a new parish team under the name Owenabue Rovers emerged. Between 1946 and 1980 the club participated in South-East divisional competitions as St Garvan's.

Gaelic football enjoyed a chequered history within the club with intermittent surges of interest in the 1930s and 1960s. It was not until the 1970s that teams competed with regularity in the various competitions. Since the turn of the 21st century, the club has won six divisional championship titles, five in football and one in hurling.

On 19 September 2010, Ger Spillane became the first Ballygarvan club player to win an All-Ireland medal at senior level. He was a member of the Cork senior football team that defeated Down by 0–16 to 0–15 in the All-Ireland final.

Grounds

Páirc Liam Mhic Cárthaigh in Ballygarvan was officially opened on 22 April 1984. The grounds are named in honour of Liam MacCarthy whose father, Eoghan, had emigrated to London from Ballygarvan in 1851.

Honours 
 Cork Junior Hurling Championship (1): 2004
 Munster Junior Club Hurling Championship (1): 2004
 South East Junior A Hurling Championship (2): 1977, 2004
 South East Junior A Football Championship (5): 2002, 2003, 2008, 2009, 2014
 Cork Minor A Football Championship (1): 1999

Notable players
The following players represented Cork senior inter-county championship teams:
 Stephen White - senior hurling
 Ger Spillane - senior football
 Aodán Mac Gearailt - Kerry footballer
 Liam McCarthy
 Emer Dillon - Cork Camogie

References

External links
 Official website

Gaelic games clubs in County Cork
Gaelic football clubs in County Cork
Hurling clubs in County Cork